Stoney Creek may refer to:

In Australia
Stony Creek, Queensland, historical spelling of the rural community of Stony Creek, Queensland
Stoney Creek Falls, in Queensland

In Canada
Stoney Creek, Ontario, was a municipality that is now part of Hamilton, Ontario
Stoney Creek (electoral district), an electoral district in Ontario
Stoney Creek (Lake Erie), a watershed administered by the Long Point Region Conservation Authority, that drains into Lake Erie
 Battle of Stoney Creek, a battle of the War of 1812
Saik'uz First Nation, often referred to as Stoney Creek First Nation (Canada)

In the United States
Stoney Creek (Delaware River tributary in Delaware)
Stoney Creek (North Carolina), a stream in Wayne County
Stoney Creek (Ararat River tributary), a stream in Surry County, North Carolina
Stonycreek River or Stoney Creek, a tributary of the Conemaugh River in southwestern Pennsylvania
Stoney Creek Farm, a bed and breakfast in Boonsboro, Maryland
Stoney Creek Records, a subsidiary of Broken Bow Records
Stoney Creek Secondary, a Conrail Line in Pennsylvania and Delaware
Stoney Creek (Delaware River tributary)

See also
Stony Creek (disambiguation)
Stonycreek (disambiguation)
Steinbach (disambiguation)